Zhu Qianwei (born 1990-09-28 in Shanghai) is a Chinese swimmer, who competed for Team China at the 2008 Summer Olympics.

Major achievements
2008 China Open - 1st 200m free

See also
China at the 2012 Summer Olympics - Swimming

References
http://2008teamchina.olympic.cn/index.php/personview/personsen/5357

1990 births
Living people
Olympic silver medalists for China
Olympic swimmers of China
Swimmers from Shanghai
Swimmers at the 2008 Summer Olympics
Swimmers at the 2012 Summer Olympics
World record holders in swimming
Chinese female freestyle swimmers
World Aquatics Championships medalists in swimming
Medalists at the FINA World Swimming Championships (25 m)
Asian Games medalists in swimming
Swimmers at the 2010 Asian Games
Medalists at the 2008 Summer Olympics
Olympic silver medalists in swimming
Universiade medalists in swimming
Asian Games gold medalists for China
Medalists at the 2010 Asian Games
Universiade bronze medalists for China
Medalists at the 2011 Summer Universiade